Parachela may refer to:

Parachela (fish), a genus of fishes in the family Cyprinidae
Parachela (tardigrade), an order of tardigrades in the class Eutardigrada